District 58 of the Oregon House of Representatives is one of 60 House legislative districts in the state of Oregon. As of 2013, the boundary for the district includes all of Union and Wallowa counties and a portion of Umatilla County. The current representative for the district is Republican Bobby Levy of Echo.

Election results
District boundaries have changed over time; therefore, representatives before 2013 may not represent the same constituency as today. General election results from 2000 to present are as follows:

See also
 Oregon Legislative Assembly
 Oregon House of Representatives

References

External links
 Oregon House of Representatives Official site
 Oregon Secretary of State: Redistricting Reform Task Force

Oregon House of Representatives districts
Umatilla County, Oregon
Union County, Oregon
Wallowa County, Oregon